Neurofilament, heavy polypeptide (NEFH) is a protein that in humans is encoded by the NEFH gene.

It is the gene for a heavy protein subunit that is combined with medium and light subunits to make neurofilaments, which form the framework for nerve cells.

Mutations in the NEFH gene are associated with Charcot-Marie-Tooth disease.

References 

Genes on human chromosome 22